The Terrorist Organization Reference Guide is a field manual jointly published by the U.S. Department of Homeland Security, U.S. Customs and Border Protection, and the US Border Patrol. The guide is a synopsis of groups and individuals designated to be terrorist organizations and is provided to field against for screening purposes.

External links
 

United States Department of Homeland Security
Counterterrorism in the United States
Terrorism databases